HMS Decoy was a  torpedo boat destroyer which served with the Royal Navy in home waters. She was launched in 1895 and sunk in a collision with the destroyer  in 1904.

Construction
She was built by John I. Thornycroft & Company at Chiswick and was launched on 7 February 1894.

Although fitted with multiple torpedo tubes, her bow tube proved useless in practice as — while running at high attack speeds — the ship was prone to overtake its own torpedo. The clumsy tube also reduced living quarters and made the bridge very prone to flooding.

Service
Decoy took part in the 1896 British Naval Manoeuvres, attached to the Channel Fleet operation from Berehaven in southern Ireland. She served as instructional tender to Cambridge, a gunnery school ship, until August 1901. Lieutenant Cyril Asser was appointed in command in February 1902, when she was based at Plymouth as part of the Devonport instructional flotilla, and was succeeded by Lieutenant Henry Ralph Heathcote on 1 July the same year. Heathcote transferred to  the following month, and was succeeded in command by Lieutenant L. J. I. Hammond on 8 August 1902. She took part in the fleet review held at Spithead on 16 August 1902 for the coronation of King Edward VII. The following month she was reported to be back in the instructional flotilla.

Courts martial regarding the sinking were subsequently assembled aboard the battleship . The first, on 22 August, attributed blame on the commander of Arun, Reginald Tyrwhitt. The second, an appeal, was held on 30 August, and dismissed the charge of neglect but confirmed the charge of hazarding both vessels.

Notes

References

Bibliography
 
 
 
 
 
 
 
 
 

 

Daring-class destroyers (1893)
1894 ships
Ships built in Chiswick
Maritime incidents in 1904
Ships sunk in collisions
Shipwrecks in the Atlantic Ocean
Ships built by John I. Thornycroft & Company